Logan Lamont Thomas Sr. (born July 1, 1991) is an American football tight end for the Washington Commanders of the National Football League (NFL). He was the starting quarterback at Virginia Tech in the early 2010s, where he finished as the school's all-time leader in passing yards and touchdowns before being drafted by the Arizona Cardinals in the fourth round of the 2014 NFL Draft. Thomas spent time as a reserve quarterback for the Miami Dolphins and New York Giants before switching to tight end, a position he last played in high school, with the Detroit Lions in 2016.

Early years
Thomas attended Brookville High School in Lynchburg, Virginia. He played quarterback, wide receiver, tight end, and defensive back for the Bees football team. As a senior, he completed 118 of 204 passes for 1,535 yards and 20 touchdowns and had 842 rushing yards and 11 touchdowns as a quarterback. On defense, he had 80 tackles and four interceptions. He played in the 2009 U.S. Army All-American Bowl. A 4-star recruit, Thomas committed to play football at Virginia Tech over several other offers.

In addition to football, Thomas also competed in track & field his junior and senior years at Brookville. He earned All-state honors in the 110m hurdles (14.95 s), the 300m hurdles (41.03 s), high jump (1.96 m), and discus (48 m). He won the long jump event at the 2009 Seminole District Outdoor T&F Championships.

College career

After being redshirted in 2009, Thomas spent 2010 as the backup quarterback to Tyrod Taylor, appearing in seven games. He completed 12 of 26 passes for 107 yards and 22 rushing yards on six attempts. He also had a two-yard receiving touchdown on his lone reception of the season.

Thomas took over as the starter in 2011. He started all fourteen games, throwing for 3,013 yards and 19 touchdowns while also contributing 469 rushing yards and 11 rushing touchdowns.

In 2012, Thomas completed 220 of 449 passes for 2,976 yards and 18 touchdowns with 16 interceptions. He also rushed for 528 yards and 9 touchdowns. As a senior in 2013, he passed for 2,907 yards with 16 touchdowns and 13 interceptions.

College statistics

Professional career

Arizona Cardinals

He was drafted in the fourth round, 120th overall, of the 2014 NFL Draft by the Arizona Cardinals. Thomas was the sixth quarterback taken in the draft behind Blake Bortles (3rd, Jacksonville Jaguars), Johnny Manziel (22nd, Cleveland Browns), Teddy Bridgewater (32nd, Minnesota Vikings), Derek Carr (36th, Oakland Raiders), and Jimmy Garoppolo (62nd, New England Patriots). He signed his four-year rookie contract on May 21, 2014.

Thomas made his NFL debut against the Denver Broncos on October 5, 2014, in relief of the injured Drew Stanton. Thomas completed his third career NFL pass for an 81-yard touchdown to Andre Ellington. Thomas became the first NFL quarterback to have his first career completion to go for 80 or more yards since Neil O'Donnell in 1991. Thomas finished the game completing a single pass in eight attempts as the Cardinals were defeated by the Broncos 41–20. After Week 16 and after the Cardinals one sided loss to the Seattle Seahawks, it was announced that the Cardinals would start rookie Thomas over the struggling Ryan Lindley. However, head coach Bruce Arians announced that the team would instead go with Lindley. He was released on September 5, 2015.

Miami Dolphins
Thomas was claimed off waivers by the Miami Dolphins on September 6, 2015. The Dolphins released Thomas on September 11, 2015. He was then re-signed by the Miami Dolphins to their practice squad on September 15, 2015. On December 16, 2015, the Miami Dolphins elevated Thomas from practice squad. The Dolphins waived Thomas on June 16, 2016.

New York Giants
On June 17, 2016, Thomas was claimed off waivers by the New York Giants. On September 3, 2016, he was released by the Giants.  The next day, he was signed to the Giants practice squad. Thomas was on and off the Giants' practice squad throughout the first three months of the season before being released on November 22, 2016, a total of 13 transactions with the team.

Detroit Lions
Thomas switched his position to tight end and was signed to the Detroit Lions' practice squad on November 28, 2016.

Buffalo Bills 

On November 30, 2016, the Buffalo Bills signed Thomas off the Lions practice squad. Thomas gained significant playing time in 2017 after fellow tight end Charles Clay was sidelined with a knee injury. He caught his first NFL touchdown, a 22-yard pass from former Virginia Tech teammate Tyrod Taylor, during a game against the Tampa Bay Buccaneers on October 22. It was the second time that they connected for a touchdown and the first since college.

Thomas finished the 2018 season with 12 receptions for 77 yards in 12 games. He also completed his first pass attempt since his time in Arizona, connecting with Robert Foster for 16 yards on a fake punt play to pick up a first down.

Detroit Lions (second stint)

On March 21, 2019, Thomas was signed by the Detroit Lions. He was released on September 1, 2019 but was re-signed the following day. He played in all 16 games and started three for the Lions. He finished the season with 16 receptions for 173 receiving yards and one receiving touchdown.

Washington Football Team / Commanders
On March 23, 2020, Thomas signed with the Washington Football Team, known as the Redskins at the time. He was placed on the reserve/COVID-19 list for the start of training camp before being activated on August 9, 2020. In Week 13 against the Pittsburgh Steelers, Thomas recorded 9 catches for 98 yards and a touchdown during the 23–17 win. He finished the 2020 season with 72 receptions for 670 yards and six touchdowns.

Thomas signed a three-year contract extension with the team, worth $24 million, on July 28, 2021. In the Week 4 game against the Atlanta Falcons, Thomas left in the first quarter due to a hamstring injury. He was placed on injured reserve after the game, and rejoined the active roster on November 29, 2021. On December 8, he was placed on injured reserve for a second time after suffering a knee injury from a low block from Las Vegas Raiders defensive end Yannick Ngakoue in Week 13. Logan finished the 2021 season with 18 receptions for 196 yards and three touchdowns over six games.

Thomas was placed on the active/physically unable to perform list at the start of 2022 training camp; he was activated on August 22.

NFL career statistics

Personal life
Thomas is married with five sons.

References

External links

Washington Commanders bio
Virginia Tech Hokies bio

1991 births
Living people
Sportspeople from Lynchburg, Virginia
Players of American football from Virginia
American football quarterbacks
American football tight ends
Virginia Tech Hokies football players
Arizona Cardinals players
Miami Dolphins players
New York Giants players
Buffalo Bills players
Detroit Lions players
Washington Commanders players
Washington Football Team players